The Iuridae are a family of scorpions in the order Scorpiones. Six genera and at least 20 described species are placed in the Iuridae.

Genera
 Anuroctonus
 Calchas
 Hadrurus (giant hairy scorpions)
 Iurus
 Neocalchas
 Protoiurus

References

Further reading

 
 
 

Scorpion families